Terence William Harvey 'Terry' Cox (born 13 March 1937, in High Wycombe, Buckinghamshire) played drums in the British folk rock bands The Pentangle, Duffy's Nucleus and Humblebums.

He also drummed with several other artists, most notably David Bowie and Elton John. He was drummer for Charles Aznavour from 1974 till 1982. In 1973, he had a songwriting partnership with Lynsey de Paul and Lenny Zakatek recorded two of their songs "Get Your Gun" and "Gotta Runaway" that was released as Zakatek on Bell Records.

Collaborations 
Alexis Korner - Sky High (1966)
Alexis Korner - Blues Incorporated (1967)
Alexis Korner - Bootleg Him! (1972)
Alexis Korner - The BBC Radio Sessions (1994)
Ashton & Lord - First of the Big Bands (1974)
Bee Gees - Cucumber Castle (1970) 
Bert Jansch - Birthday Blues (1968)
Bert Jansch - Rosemary Lane (1971)
Bread, Love & Dreams - Amaryllis (1971)
 Charles Aznavour - Aznavour Live 4: Olympia (1980)
Cleo Laine - Return to Carnegie (1976)
Damian Halloran and Maria Millward - Great Stories and Songs (2002)
Dana Gillespie - Weren't Born a Man (1973)
David Bowie - Space Oddity (1969) 
Digby Fairweather - "Song for Snady"
 Duffy Power - Little Boy Blue (1965–67)
 Duffy Power - Sky Blues (Rare Radio Sessions, 1968–94)
 Duffy Power - Innovations (1970)
Elton John - Elton John (1970)
Elton John - Madman Across the Water (1971)
Fishbaugh Fishbaugh Zorn - Fishbaugh Fishbaugh & Zorn (1972)
George Martin - Live and Let Die (Soundtrack, 1973)
Harold McNair - Fence (1970)
Harvey Andrews - Friends of Mine (1973)
Jade - Fly on Strangewings (1970)
Jan & Lorraine - Gypsy People (1969)
John Dawson - Friend of Mine (1975)
John Renbourn - Sir John Alot of Merrie Englandes Musyk Thyng & Ye Grene Knyghte (1968)
John Renbourn - Lady and the Unicorn (1970)
John Renbourn - Faro Annie (1971)
John Williams - Changes (1971)
Leslie Duncan - Sing Children Sing (1971)
Linda Lewis - Say No More (1971)
Long John Baldry - Good to Be Alive (1976)
Lynsey de Paul - Surprise (1973)
Lynsey de Paul - Taste Me...Don't Waste Me (1974)
Marian Segal - Fly on Strange Wings
Mike Batt - Schizophonia (1977)
Mike Silver - Troubadour (1973)
Patrick and Matrix Yandall - That Feels Nice! (1993)
Pete Atkin - The Road of Silk (1974)
Philwit & Pegasus - Philwit & Pegasus (1970)
Ray Warleigh - First Album (1969)
Rick Springfield - Comic Book Heroes (1974)
Rupert Hine - Pick Up a Bone (1971)
Scott Walker - Stretch (1973)
Scott Walker - We Had It All (1974)
Shawn Brothers - Follow Me (1974)
Shirley Collins - Within Sound Box Set (1970)
Shirley & Dolly Collins - Love, Death and The Lady (1970) 
The Sallyangie - Children of the Sun (1969)
 Therapy - Almanac (1972)
 Tudor Lodge - Tudor Lodge (1971)
Wally Whyton - It's Me Mum

References

English drummers
British folk rock musicians
English session musicians
1937 births
Living people
People from High Wycombe